Lenzing is a small town of approximately 5,000 residents, three kilometers north of Lake Attersee in Austria,  It is located in the Upper Austrian part of the Salzkammergut.

Lenzing's economy is partly based on tourism, but the town is much more known as an industrial site; it is the world headquarters of Lenzing AG, which is the world leader in the production of cellulose-based fiber such as viscose and Lyocell.  , it manufactures one-fifth of the world's cellulose fiber.

Lenzing Concentration Camp 
In November 1944, the first transport of 500 women from Auschwitz came to Lenzing to work in the newly opened local subcamp of Mauthausen concentration camp which was located in the Lenzinger suburb of Pettighofen.  Eventually 600 female prisoners, mainly Jewish women came to Lenzing from Auschwitz, and a few others came from Ravensbrück and the main camp at Mauthausen.  The SS staff in the small subcamp included mainly SS men as well as a small contingent of SS women.  Frau Schmidt served in her capacities as Lagerführerin, or female commandant.  Her main boss was Mauthausen commandant Franz Ziereis who commanded all of the subcamps in Austria.  Later Margarete Freinberger became an Oberaufseherin in the camp under Schmidt.  Only one other female overseer is known today, Maria Kunik.  Attitudes by the former guards was reported as arrogant and brutal, but not as horrible as in Mauthausen proper.  The prisoners in the Lenzing camp worked for the Lenzing AG company making artificial wool.  Many women in fact died from the work, and others perished in the Mauthausen gas chambers when they could no longer work.  In the winter of January 1945, a group of prisoners were severely injured when a train carrying supplies to the camp derailed.  The SS sent them, along with any other prisoners who could no longer work to Mauthausen where they were gassed.  The women "cried and wailed all the way to the main camp."  In May 1945 the American Army neared the Lenzing camp.  The SS staff fled after Lagerführerin Schmidt gave a speech to the surviving women as to not "dishonor them".  On 5 May 1945 the US Army liberated 565 women from the Lenzing subcamp.

Population

References

Cities and towns in Vöcklabruck District
Holocaust locations in Austria